The 1979 Rothmans International Series was an Australian motor racing series open to Australian Formula 5000, World Formula 1 and Australian Formula Pacific cars. It was the fourth and final Rothmans International Series. The series was won by Larry Perkins driving an Elfin MR8 Chevrolet.

Calendar
The series was contested over four rounds with one race per round.

Points system
Points were awarded on a 10-9-8-7-6-5-4-3-2-1 basis for the first ten places at each of the first three rounds.

Points were awarded on a 15-14-13-12-11-10-9-8-7-6-5-4-3-2-1 basis for the first fifteen places at the fourth round.

Series results

References

Rothmans International Series
Rothmans
Formula 5000